A multiple vehicle collision (colloquially known as a pile-up, multi-car collision, multi-vehicle collision, or simply a multi) is a road traffic collision involving many vehicles. Generally occurring on high-capacity and high-speed routes such as freeways, they are one of the deadliest forms of traffic collisions. The most disastrous pileups have involved more than a hundred vehicles.

Terminology 
A chain collision can be defined as "an accident involving 3 or more vehicles in which one vehicle has only rear impact damage (i.e., the "lead" vehicle); one vehicle has only frontal damage; and all other vehicles have frontal and rear impact damage (these are the "middle" vehicles)".

Statistics

British statistics 

In Great Britain, statistics are available on the number of vehicles involved in crashes. 
 In 2013, there were: 42487 single vehicle crashes, 82429 dual vehicle crashes, 13744 crashes involving three or more vehicles (%) for a total of 138660 reported crashes. In crashes with three or more vehicles there were 228 motorists killed and 19 pedestrians killed.
 In 2020, there were: 25730 single vehicle crashes, 57392 dual vehicle crashes, 8077 crashes involving three or more vehicles (%) for a total of 91199 reported crashes. In crashes with three or more vehicles there was 200 motorists killed (% of all motorists killed) and 17 pedestrians killed (% of all pedestrians killed).

Causes 
Pile-ups generally occur in low-visibility conditions as drivers on freeways are sometimes caught out by driving too close to the vehicle in front and not adjusting to the road conditions.

Chain-reaction crashes can also occur in conditions of good visibility, when black ice or other road hazards are encountered unexpectedly as drivers round a curve or crest a hill.

Multiple vehicle collisions can also occur when a third vehicle is too close to the initial collision to avoid hitting one or both of the vehicles. Due to the high traffic speeds on the road, if one car develops a problem and suddenly halts, those behind it cannot stop in time and may hit it. Considering that these roads often have high traffic volumes, more cars are forced into braking and skidding, darting into other lanes and in front of oncoming traffic and so more vehicles become involved, creating a chain reaction effect.

Determining the cause of such collisions is difficult for investigators and it is often impossible to tell if negligence caused the crash. In spite of their frequency, little formal research has been done in the United States regarding their cause or causes.

Effects 

Multiple-vehicle collisions are particularly deadly as the mass of crumpled vehicles makes escape for survivors difficult. Even if survivors are able to exit their vehicles, other cars may strike them. Individual vehicles in a multiple-vehicle collision are often hit multiple times at high speed, increasing the risk of injury to passengers who may have survived the first impact with the benefit of now-discharged protective airbags. Collisions after the initial collision may occur from the side of the vehicle, where the passenger compartment is more vulnerable.

A fire in one part of the collision can quickly spread via spilled gasoline and cover the entire crash area. Multiple-vehicle collisions can also overwhelm local emergency services making speedy rescues more difficult. If the collision takes place in a remote area, getting medical help to the scene can be difficult.

The destruction and intense heat of fires can also damage roadways, particularly by melting and burning the asphalt or spalling concrete surfaces. The structural steel of bridges and overpasses can also be weakened by the heat. A fiery pileup inside a tunnel is the most serious, as there is little means to escape the poisonous fumes and the confined heat may damage structural supports.

The large scale of these collisions can close highway routes for several days, or even longer if highway support structures are damaged.

Avoidance 

A NHTSA report suggests that a vehicle fit with a center high mounted stop lamps has 23.7% less risk to be involved as a lead vehicle in a chain collision while it has 16.0% less risk to be involved as a middle vehicle in such a chain collision.

France 

In France, in the ASFA motorway network, the out of all vehicle crashes with injuries, single vehicle crashes make up 42% of the total, dual vehicle crashes make up 41%, and crashes involving three or more vehicles make up 17%.

Korea 

On Korean expressways, chain crashes represent 10.7% of crashes with injuries involving truck drivers. On Korean rural roads, chain crashes represent 0.6% of crashes with injuries involving truck drivers.

Major pileups

Motorsports
Multiple vehicle collisions can occur in the restricted courses used in motorsports as well, most commonly after a green flag (on road courses) being waved following a warm-up lap during the start of the race. Reporters and fans apply subjective guidelines as to what threshold needs to be crossed before a simple on-track incident can be described as such. NASCAR fans, for example, talk about the "Big One", where many cars can be or are involved in a wreck while running close together.

See also
Plane crash

References

Automotive safety
Road collisions by type
Road hazards